Elizabeth Eden Harris (born May 31, 1997), known professionally as Cupcakke (often stylized as CupcakKe; pronounced ), is an American rapper from Chicago, Illinois. She is known for her hypersexualized, brazen, and often comical persona and music.

Cupcakke began her career as a rapper in 2012 by releasing material online. She came to attention in 2015 when two of her songs, "Deepthroat" and "Vagina", went viral on video-sharing platforms. The songs were later included on her debut mixtape, Cum Cake (2016), which was included on Rolling Stones list of the Best Rap Albums of 2016 at number 23. A second mixtape, S.T.D (Shelters to Deltas), was released in 2016 and preceded the studio albums Audacious (2016), Queen Elizabitch (2017), Ephorize (2018), and Eden (2018). Since then, she has been steadily releasing standalone singles, such as "Grilling Niggas", "Lawd Jesus", "Discounts" and "H2hoe".

Early life 
Elizabeth Eden Harris was born on May 31, 1997, in Chicago, Illinois, and was raised on King Drive, near Parkway Gardens. Harris was raised by a single mother and spent nearly four years in Chicago's homeless shelters starting at age seven. In the lyrics of her song "Ace Hardware", Harris recounts her experiences struggling with depression and being raped by her father, who is a pastor. She has referred to her father as a "deadbeat", "con artist", and  "child molester." She attended Dulles Elementary School with other established Chicago rappers such as Lil Reese and Chief Keef. She got an early start into music and poetry at the age of ten by her involvement in her local church. It was also there that she got her start in performing, where she would perform for her local pastors by reciting poetry about her Christianity and faith.

When she was 13, she met a fellow churchgoer who encouraged her to turn the poetry into rap music, and she became infatuated with the art form. She cites 50 Cent, Lil' Kim, and Da Brat as early influences to her musical style.

Career

2012–2016: Early output, Cum Cake, S.T.D (Shelters to Deltas), and Audacious 
Harris released her first music video, "Gold Digger" onto her official YouTube channel in August 2012. She was only 15 at the time of its release—the original video has since been deleted. Over the next few years, she continued to release original music, as well as freestyles using beats from other artists through her YouTube channel, where she has amassed over 812,000 subscribers.

In October 2015, the official music video for her song "Vagina" was released on YouTube via YMCFilmz. According to Cupcakke, she wrote the song because she was inspired by Khia's song "My Neck, My Back (Lick It)". One month later, Harris released "Deepthroat" on her own channel. Within weeks, the two videos went viral on YouTube, Worldstar, and Facebook. The songs later became singles for Harris' debut mixtape, Cum Cake, which was released in February 2016. Its release was also supported by further singles such as "Juicy Coochie", "Tit for Tat", and "Pedophile". A writer for Pitchfork, which included it on "9 Rap Mixtapes You Might Have Missed This Year", called the mixtape a "well rounded introduction to a skilled writer" and said it used songs "about love, loss, and hardship with its more explicit tracks to create a full profile of the up-and-coming Chicago rapper". "Pedophile" was also specifically noted for its "blunt commentary" on sexual assault.

In June 2016, Harris released her second mixtape, S.T.D (Shelters to Deltas). It was preceded by the single "Best Dick Sucker". Other tracks, such as "Doggy Style" and "Motherlands", were also later released as singles. The mixtape was listed among Rolling Stone "Best Rap Albums of 2016 So Far".

In October 2016, Harris released her debut studio album, Audacious. The album was preceded by the single "Picking Cotton", which was described by MTV News as "a protest song about racist cops". Other tracks on the album such as "Spider-Man Dick" and "LGBT" were accompanied by music videos. In an interview Harris stated that she made the song "LGBT" "...strictly for the gay community to know that they are loved and don't need to feel judged."

2017–2018: Queen Elizabitch, Ephorize and Eden 

In February 2017, Harris released "Cumshot", which served as the lead single to her second studio album. On March 7, English singer-songwriter Charli XCX premiered her song "Lipgloss", which featured Harris. The song was later included on XCX's mixtape, Number 1 Angel, which was released on March 10.

Her second studio album, titled Queen Elizabitch, was released on March 31, 2017. The Fader described it as "the type of nasty rap that made her a viral sensation, alongside all-out pop bangers like '33rd' and the confessional a cappella freestyle 'Reality, Pt. 4'." Stereogum also noted that the album "sees CupcakKe engaging with the current political climate and radio trends in a way that could help her cross over to a more mainstream audience".

On April 7, 2017, Queen Elizabitch was removed from online streaming services and digital music stores due to an illegal backing track that Harris had purchased from what she described as a "shady producer". She soon announced on Twitter that Queen Elizabitch would be re-released on April 16. She then released the singles "Exit" and "Cartoons" in November 2017.

Her third studio album, Ephorize, was released on January 5, 2018. Exclaim! called it "her most polished work to date" and noted that "she still slides in plenty of deliciously dirty one-liners throughout the new record." HotNewHipHop commented that "Ephorize might be one of the most introspective bodies of work she's dropped off to date." Pitchfork called it Cupcakke's "best album yet, with terrific production and a barrage of raps that reveal Elizabeth Harris to be far more than her hilarious and absurdly raunchy one-liners." She released music videos for the songs "Duck Duck Goose" and "Fullest". The former features her "showing off an extensive collection of dildos as well as a souvenir Statue of Liberty."

On November 9, 2018, Harris released her fourth studio album, Eden. She released music videos for the lead single "Quiz", and for the following singles "Hot Pockets" and "Blackjack".

2019–present: Hiatus and standalone singles 

On January 8, 2019, Harris was reportedly taken to a hospital in Chicago after tweeting that she was going to commit suicide. In a tweet posted the next day, Harris wrote "I've been fighting with depression for the longest. Sorry that I did it public last night but I'm ok. I went to the hospital & I'm finally getting the help that I need to get through, be happy, & deliver great music. Thanks for all the prayers but please don't worry bout me."

On January 11, 2019, the single "Squidward Nose" was released, and on February 21, a music video for the song featuring John Early premiered. On April 17, 2019, Harris released a remix of Lil Nas X's song "Old Town Road", titled "Old Town Hoe", on her YouTube channel, and its music video the following day.

In September 2019, Harris made several posts on social media criticizing several artists such as Camila Cabello (she accused Cabello of racism) and Shawn Mendes, followed by her retirement announcement in an Instagram Live video. She stated, "This live is going to be the last video that y'all [will] see of me. I am completely done with music". She said that she would no longer be releasing music to the public and that she would be removing her music from all streaming platforms. She stated that she was disturbed to see children in videos and young people at her shows singing along to her explicit songs, felt she was corrupting the youth with her raunchy songs. Harris also told fans that she has a "very bad gambling addiction" and that she had lost $700,000 at a casino in September 2018. Harris' Instagram and Twitter accounts were deactivated after the livestream ended. Her music remained available on streaming platforms.

On November 7, 2019, Harris came out of retirement after a 40-day absence on all social media platforms with a tweet; "Jesus fasted for 40 days & so did I...... Nov 16th". On March 6, 2020, Harris released a new single, "Lawd Jesus". Harris uploaded her first video to YouTube since her previous deletion of all videos on her channel the previous year, with the double video for singles "Grilling Niggas" and "Lawd Jesus", on May 13, 2020.

On June 1, 2020, Cupcakke released the single "Lemon Pepper" with half of the proceeds going towards the Minnesota Bail fund. Another single, "Discounts" was released on June 26. The song received critical acclaim, peaked at number 78 on the UK Singles Downloads Chart and number 80 on the UK Singles Sales Chart, becoming her first single to do so. "Discounts" also reached number one on the US iTunes chart, which is her first song to do so. She is also the only female rapper to have a number-one song on the iTunes chart with no label.

On December 16, 2020, Harris received significant media attention after releasing "How to Rob (Remix)", a diss track. It was released on YouTube and sees Harris take aim at Megan Thee Stallion, Lizzo, and Lil' Kim, among others. The song received positive reviews.

On March 1, 2021, "Deepthroat" was certified Gold by the Recording Industry Association of America (RIAA), which denotes five hundred thousand units based on sales and track-equivalent on-demand streams. It is her first song to be certified by the RIAA. In June, Rolling Stone magazine reported that Harris will be co-hosting the upcoming OutTV reality show Hot Haus with Tiffany Pollard, which will mark the rapper's TV hosting debut. Harris said of the casting decision, "As soon as I heard what this show stood for, owning your sexuality and talent, I knew I had to be involved."

In 2021, her songs went viral on TikTok, mainly in the form of remixes; she later joined the platform because of it.

On May 31, 2022, Harris released the single "H2Hoe".

Discography

Studio albums

Mixtapes

Singles

As lead artist

As featured artist

Guest appearances

Music videos 

*Deleted music videos

As featured artist

Tours 
 The Marilyn Monhoe Tour (2017)
 The Ephorize Tour (2018)
 The Eden Tour (2018–2019)

See also 
 Music of Illinois

References

External links 

Cupcakke on Spotify

1997 births
Living people
21st-century American rappers
African-American women rappers
African-American women singer-songwriters
American hip hop singers
Dirty rap musicians
Alternative hip hop musicians
Rappers from Chicago
Singers from Chicago
Singer-songwriters from Illinois
American LGBT rights activists
21st-century women rappers
Internet memes
21st-century African-American women singers